The Usher Baronetcy, of Norton in Ratho in the County of Midlothian, and of Wells in Hobkirk in the County of Roxburgh, is a title in the Baronetage of the United Kingdom.

It was created on 29 August 1899 for John Usher, a whisky distiller and benefactor, brother of Andrew Usher. The brothers founded Andrew Usher & Company and later the North British Distillery Company, and John assisted in founding the John Usher Institute of Public Health and a chair in public health at the University of Edinburgh in 1898. John married Mary Balmer, and together they had seven children, including Robert Usher, the 2nd Baronet.

Usher baronets, of Norton and Wells (1899)

Sir John Usher, 1st Baronet (1828–1904)
Sir Robert Usher, 2nd Baronet (1860–1933)
Sir John Turnbull Usher, 3rd Baronet (1891–1951)
Sir Robert Stuart Usher, 4th Baronet (1898–1962)
Sir Peter Lionel Usher, 5th Baronet (1931–1990)
Sir Robert Edward Usher, 6th Baronet (1934–1994)
Sir William John Tevenar Usher, 7th Baronet (1940–1998)
Sir Andrew John Usher, 8th Baronet (born 1963)

The heir apparent to the baronetcy is Rory James Andrew Usher, eldest son of the 8th Baronet (born 1991)

Notes

References
Kidd, Charles, Williamson, David (editors). Debrett's Peerage and Baronetage (1990 edition). New York: St Martin's Press, 1990,

External links
Short biography and painting of Sir John Usher, 1st Baronet
History of the Usher family

Usher